Kanlıköy is a village in Cyprus, 5 km west of Gönyeli. De facto, it is under the control of Northern Cyprus.

References

Communities in Nicosia District
Populated places in Lefkoşa District